USS Belleau Wood was a United States Navy  light aircraft carrier active during World War II in the Pacific Theater from 1943 to 1945. The ship also served in the First Indochina War under French Navy temporary service as Bois Belleau.

Originally laid down as the  New Haven (CL-76), she was finished as an aircraft carrier. Reclassified CV-24 on 16 February 1942 and renamed Belleau Wood on 31 March 1942 in honor of the Battle of Belleau Wood in World War I.  She was launched on 6 December 1942 by New York Shipbuilding Corporation, Camden, New Jersey, and sponsored by Mrs. Thomas Holcomb, wife of the Commandant of the Marine Corps.  She was commissioned on 31 March 1943, with Captain A. M. Pride in command. During the war, she was reclassified CVL-24 on 15 July 1943.

Service history

United States Navy
After a brief shakedown cruise, Belleau Wood reported to the Pacific Fleet, arriving at Pearl Harbor on 26 July 1943. After supporting the occupation of Baker Island (1 September) and taking part in the Tarawa (18 September) and Wake Island (5–6 October) raids, she joined TF 50 for the invasion of the Gilbert Islands (19 November – 4 December 1943).

Belleau Wood operated with TF 58 during the seizure of Kwajalein and Majuro Atolls, Marshall Islands (29 January – 3 February 1944), Truk raid (16–17 February); Saipan-Tinian-Rota-Guam raids (21–22 February); Palau-Yap-Ulithi-Woleai raid (30 March–1 April); Wakde and Sawar Airfield raids to neutralize the danger of air attack during the Battle of Hollandia landings in New Guinea (22–24 April); Truk-Satawan-Ponape raid (29 April–1 May); occupation of Saipan (11–24 June), 1st Bonins raid (15–16 June), Battle of the Philippine Sea (19–20 June); and 2nd Bonins raid (24 June). During the Battle of the Philippine Sea, Belleau Woods planes sank the Japanese carrier .

After an overhaul at Pearl Harbor (29 June – 31 July 1944), Belleau Wood rejoined TF 58 for the last stages of the occupation of Guam (2–10 August). She joined TF 38 and took part in the strikes in support of the occupation of the southern Palaus (6 September–14 October); Philippine Islands raids (9–24 September); Morotai landings (15 September); Okinawa raid (10 October); northern Luzon and Formosa raids (11–14 October); Luzon strikes (15 and 17 October–19 October), and the Battle off Cape Engaño (24–26 October). On 30 October, while Belleau Wood was patrolling with her task group east of Leyte, she shot down a Japanese kamikaze plane which fell on her flight deck aft, causing fires which set off ammunition. Before the fire could be brought under control, 92 men had either died or were missing.

After temporary repairs at Ulithi (2–11 November), Belleau Wood steamed to Hunters Point, California, for permanent repairs and an overhaul, arriving on 29 November. She departed San Francisco Bay on 20 January 1945 and joined TF 58 at Ulithi on 7 February. From 15 February–4 March, she took part in the raids on Honshū Island, Japan, and the Nansei Shoto, as well as supporting the landings on Iwo Jima. She also took part in the 5th Fleet strikes against Japan (17 March–26 May) and the 3rd Fleet strikes (27 May–11 June). After embarking Air Group 31 at Leyte (13 June–1 July), she rejoined the 3rd Fleet for the final strikes against the Japanese home islands (10 July–15 August). The last Japanese aircraft shot down in the war was a Yokosuka D4Y3 "Judy" dive bomber which was shot down by Clarence "Bill" A. Moore, an F6F pilot of "The Flying Meat-Axe" VF-31 from Belleau Wood.

Belleau Wood launched her planes on 2 September for the mass flight over Tokyo, Japan, during the surrender ceremonies. She remained in Japanese waters until 13 October. Arriving at Pearl Harbor on 28 October, she departed three days later with 1,248 servicemen for San Diego. She remained on "Magic Carpet" duty, returning servicemen from Guam and Saipan to San Diego, until 31 January 1946. During the next year, Belleau Wood was moored at various docks in the San Francisco area, undergoing inactivation. She was placed out of commission in reserve at Alameda Naval Air Station on 13 January 1947.

Belleau Wood received the Presidential Unit Citation and 12 battle stars during World War II.

French Navy
She remained in reserve until transferred to the French Navy under the Mutual Defense Assistance Act on 5 September 1953. In French service, she sailed under the name Bois Belleau (literal translation of "Belleau Wood").

In April 1954, the carrier departed from the Toulon French Naval Base, Toulon toward French Indochina in order to replace . She arrived around 20 May in Halong Bay. Although the critical Battle of Dien Bien Phu was over, her US-built fighters and bombers were immediately used by the French forces, as the war was still ongoing. After peace with the Viet Minh, the Geneva Conference was signed on 21 July 1954. Bois Belleau sailed for France, where she then joined the Algerian War.

Bois Belleau was returned to the United States in September 1960, stricken from the Navy List on 1 October 1960, and scrapped.

Significance of the name
The ship was named in memory of the World War I Battle of Belleau Wood, in which United States soldiers and Marines of the American Expeditionary Forces, defeated German troops after nearly four weeks of intense fighting. According to United States Marine Corps lore, the German defenders referred to them as Teufelshunde (literally, "Devil Dogs") and it was this moniker that became the ship's mascot, and one of the nicknames for US Marines (Devil Dog).

References

Further reading
 Aircraft Carriers of the United States Navy 1922–1947. Marrickville, NSW: Topmill Pty., 1999.  
 Belleau Wood(Aircraft carrier : CVL-24). "Flight quarters" : the war story of the U.S.S. Belleau Wood. Los Angeles : Cole-Holmquist Press, 1946. 
 Ewing, Steve. American cruisers of World War II : a pictorial encyclopedia. Missoula, Mont. : Pictorial Histories Pub. Co., 1984.  
 Friedman, Norman. U.S. Aircraft Carriers: An Illustrated Design History. London: Arms and Armour, 1983.  
</ref>
 Stille, Mark and Tony Bryan. US Navy aircraft carriers 1942–45 : WWII-built ships. Oxford : Osprey, 2007.  
 Terzibaschitsch, Stefan. Aircraft Carriers of the U.S. Navy. Greenwich: Conway Maritime Press, 1980.

Media links
Departute of the Bois Belleau from Toulon (newsreels video)
Arrival in the French Indochina of the Bois Belleau (newsreels video)

External links

USS BELLEAU WOOD(CV-24)(later CVL-24)
USS Belleau Wood (CVL-24, originally CV-24), 1943–1960 
USS Belleau Wood (CVL 24)
USS BELLEAU WOOD CV 24
 PA Bois Belleau R97 (USS Belleau Wood in the French Navy)
Air Group 31 (CAG-31) was the last carrier air group to serve aboard USS Belleau Wood
USS Belleau Wood at Nine Sisters Light Carrier Historical Documentary Project

Independence-class aircraft carriers
Ships built by New York Shipbuilding Corporation
1942 ships
World War II aircraft carriers of the United States
Independence-class aircraft carriers of the French Navy
Cold War aircraft carriers of France